Warry is a surname. Notable people with the surname include:

Fred Warry (1880–1959), Australian rules footballer 
Marty Warry (born 1977), Australian rules footballer
Richard Symes Warry (1829-1891), Australian politician
Thomas Symes Warry (1819-1864), Australian politician